Johnston railway station is an unstaffed railway station in the village of Johnston in Pembrokeshire, Wales. It has gone by various names and is now operated by Transport for Wales Rail. Train stops are made at the station by request only.

The station was the junction for trains to Neyland and also the branch line to Milford Haven. Johnston is the penultimate stop on the West Wales Line before .

History 
Originally named Johnston, it has been renamed several times: to Milford Road in November 1859; to Johnston on 7 September 1863; to Johnston (Pembroke) on 18 June 1928; to Johnston (Dyfed) on 3 May 1976, before finally resuming its original name. The station served as the junction for trains to Neyland and also the branch line to Milford Haven (the main line since the closure of the Neyland route in 1964).

Milford passengers would here make a connection to services eastwards to Haverfordwest and beyond. A station building was situated on the upside, and a waiting shelter on the downside. A pedestrian bridge connected the two platforms. A goods shed survived until the 1930s.

At a short distance north of the station, the line was connected to the railway line serving the anthracite trade at Hook.

Services
InterCity 125 services to/from London Paddington ran through Johnston to Milford Haven until the early 1990s, ending in 1994.

The station, and all trains serving it, are operated by Transport for Wales Rail. Trains stop here by request only. The usual service pattern is one train every two hours in each direction, westwards to Milford Haven railway station and eastwards to Manchester Piccadilly via ,  and Cardiff Central.

Facilities 
The station is unstaffed, so tickets must be bought on the train or prior to travel. There is small covered shelter available, along with a customer help point, timetable information boards and a digital CIS display to offer train running details. A free car park is located opposite the platform, with capacity for 8 vehicles.

References

External links 

Railway stations in Pembrokeshire
DfT Category F2 stations
Former Great Western Railway stations
Railway stations in Great Britain opened in 1856
Railway stations served by Transport for Wales Rail
Railway request stops in Great Britain